The Vogtlandkreis is a Landkreis (rural district) in the southwest of Saxony, Germany, at the borders to Thuringia, Bavaria, and the Czech Republic. Neighboring districts are (from south clockwise) Hof, Saale-Orla, Greiz, Zwickau and Erzgebirgskreis.

Plauen is the administrative center and largest city of the district. Other major cities (Große Kreisstädte) are Reichenbach im Vogtland, Auerbach, and Oelsnitz im Vogtland.

History
The Vogtland became part of the Holy Roman Empire under king Conrad III in the 12th century. In 1209 the minister dynasty administrating the area was split into three areas, Weida, Greiz and Gera-Plauen. When centralized power over the area decreased, county leaders, local administrators, called in Latin advocatus or in German Vögte, were appointed, giving the area its current name. The Vogtland war (1354-1357) ended this administration and the area changed ownership to Bohemia.

In 1546 Henry IV, Burgrave of Plauen got the area from the Bohemian king and later emperor Ferdinand I. His children inherited not only the land, but also crippling debts, so to pay these 1563 the area was bought by Saxony from Henry VI, and when in 1569 Henry VI finally ceased to claim ownership the new leadership created the first Vogtland district (Voigtländischen Creiß).

1657-1718 Saxony was split into parts, the Vogtland belonged to Saxe-Zeitz. In 1835 the new constitutional monarchy changed the administration and abolished the old district, and instead the Amtshauptmannschaft Plauen was created, and in 1867 those of Auerbach and Oelsnitz.  1907 the city of Plauen left the district and became district-free city.

1952 the East German government with the big administrative reform renamed them to Kreise (districts), and created the new districts Klingenthal and Reichenbach by decreasing the size of the previous ones. After the German Reunification the changes of the 1952 reform were mostly undone, and in 1996 the 5 districts were merged to form the Vogtlandkreis.

In the district reform of August 1, 2008 the city of Plauen was included into the district.

Geography
The Vogtlandkreis is named after the geographic area it covers, the Vogtland, which was so called because it was governed by Vogts. Located in the Erzgebirge it contains a lot of forests. The main river is the White Elster. The mountain of Bezelberg (638 m) lies within the district.

People
The first German cosmonaut, Sigmund Jähn was born in the Vogtland. His hometown, the small town of Morgenröthe-Rautenkranz, in the municipality Muldenhammer, houses a small Space Exploration exhibition.

Coat of arms
The lion on the left side of the coat of arms is traditional symbol of the Vögte of Weida, Gera and Plauen, which was confirmed in 1294. The eagle on the right side stands for the Holy Roman Empire, as the Vogtland belonged to the Empire directly.

Towns and municipalities

References

External links